Marcus Oskarsson (born September 20, 1993) is a Swedish ice hockey defenceman. He is currently playing with Frisk Asker of the Norwegian GET-ligaen.

Oskarsson made his Swedish Hockey League debut playing with Luleå HF during the 2012–13 season.

References

External links

1993 births
Living people
Almtuna IS players
Asplöven HC players
Frisk Asker Ishockey players
Luleå HF players
Modo Hockey players
Södertälje SK players
Swedish ice hockey defencemen
People from Kiruna Municipality
Sportspeople from Norrbotten County